Oncidium ciliatum is a species of orchid endemic to Brazil.

Synonyms 
Oncidium barbatum var. ciliatum (Lindl.) Lindl.
Oncidium ciliolatum Hoffmanns.
Oncidium fimbriatum Hoffmanns.
Oncidium subciliatum Hoffmanns.
Oncidium barbatum Lindl. & Paxton
Oncidium trichodes Lindl.
Oncidium micropogon var. bahiense Cogn.
Oncidium blossfeldianum Schltr.
Oncidium bahiense (Cogn.) Schltr.
Oncidium psyche Schltr.
Oncidium reisii Hoehne & Schltr.
Alatiglossum psyche (Schltr.) Baptista
Alatiglossum trichodes (Lindl.) Baptista
Alatiglossum ciliatum (Lindl.) Baptista

References

External links 

ciliatum
Endemic orchids of Brazil